The Elk Mountain Hotel, also known as the John S. Evans Hotel, Mountain View Hotel and Grandview Hotel was built in 1905 in Elk Mountain, Wyoming on the bank of the Medicine Bow River. The two-story wood-frame building was built next to the 1880 Garden Spot Pavilion, a dance hall that was a social center in an otherwise isolated portion of Wyoming. The hotel was built by John Evans, the owner of the Elk Mountain Saloon, who in 1903 had acquired the Pavilion. Evans catered to the mining trade through the 1930s. By that time better roads allowed tourism to increase, and the hotel provided accommodation to hunters and tourists. Evans sold the property in 1947 to Mark and Lucille Jackson, who remodeled the hotel and the pavilion.

The hotel features a two-story porch on the narrow front facade. Guest rooms are primarily on the second floor, with public rooms below.

The Garden Spot Pavilion was built in 1880 by John S. Jones and expanded in 1920 by Evans. The pavilion attracted major bands during the Big Band Era as well as country and western musicians. The pavilion featured a sprung dance floor, accomplished by laying the finish floor over widely spaced pine logs, encircled by seating areas. The exterior featured a stepped false front that concealed the gabled roof. Performers playing at the Garden Spot included Lawrence Welk, Tommy Dorsey, Louis Armstrong, Hank Thompson and Jim Reeves. The pavilion was demolished in the early 2000s after it had become deteriorated.

The Elk Mountain Hotel and the now-demolished Garden Spot Pavilion were placed on the National Register of Historic Places on October 10, 1986.

References

External links
 Elk Mountain Hotel history on the hotel's website
 Elk Mountain Hotel at the Wyoming State Historic Preservation Office
 Elk Mountain Hotel and Garden Spot Pavilion at wyohistory.org

National Register of Historic Places in Carbon County, Wyoming
Hotel buildings completed in 1905
Hotel buildings on the National Register of Historic Places in Wyoming
1905 establishments in Wyoming